Balawali is a small village in Bijnor district in the Indian state of Uttar Pradesh near Railway Bridge on Ganga River. Balawali is a Railway Station also with code (BLW).

Anderson Railway Bridge
The Bridge was made under the guidance of Engineer Sir Jason Anderson & hence was named Anderson Bridge. This iron rail bridge used to operate rail traffic, but in the year 2001 the railway bridge was closed due to the new bridges being built nearby. Trains are still operating from the new bridge.

The 128 year old railway bridge was made ready for road traffic movement from the year 2016. The new Railway Bridge  i.e.  was built across the holy river Ganga near Balawali railway station between the Laksar and Najibabad Railway route in Uttar Pradesh. This Railway bridge is a landmark of the UP and Uttarakhand border. The Old Railway Bridge is used for road transportation and the other New Bridge for road transportation is under construction.

External links
pincode.net
News from Balawali
दूसरी पारी को तैयार हुआ पुराना बालावाली रेलवे पुल

Villages in Bijnor district